Georgy (Georgi) Geshev (Geschew) (born October 8, 1903 in Sofia – died July 15, 1937) was a Bulgarian chess master.

At the beginning of his career, he tied for 6-7th at Varna 1926 (K. Atanasov, G. Slavchev, and A. Telegin won), shared 1st with Pinkas at Sofia 1927, won at Trnovo 1928, and took 2nd, behind A. Gyurov, at Sofia 1929.

He won the Bulgarian Chess Championship four times (1933 – jointly, 1934, 1935, and 1936. At the play-off match for the 1933 title, he triumphed against Yury Toshev (4½ : 3½), to become the first official Bulgarian Champion.

Geshev represented Bulgaria on first board at the 3rd unofficial Chess Olympiad held in Munich 1936.

References

External links

1903 births
1937 deaths
Chess players from Sofia
20th-century chess players